Cibiana di Cadore is a comune (municipality) in the province of Belluno in the Italian region of Veneto, located about  north of Venice and about  north of Belluno.

The municipality of Cibiana di Cadore contains the frazioni (subdivisions, mainly villages and hamlets) Borgate: Masarié, Cibiana di Sotto, Pianezze, Strassei, Sù Gesia, Le Nove, Col, Pian Gran, and Dèona.

Cibiana di Cadore borders the following municipalities: Forno di Zoldo, Ospitale di Cadore, Valle di Cadore, Vodo di Cadore.

Demographic evolution

References 

Cities and towns in Veneto